Agave americana, common names century plant, maguey, or American aloe, is a species of flowering plant in the family Asparagaceae, native to Mexico and the United States in Texas. It is cultivated worldwide as an ornamental plant, and has been naturalized in many regions, including parts of the West Indies, South America, Mediterranean Basin, Africa, Canary Islands,  India, China, Thailand, and Australia.

Despite the common name "American aloe", it is not in the same family as aloe, though it is in the same order, Asparagales.

Description

Although it is called the century plant, it typically lives only 10 to 30 years.

Its common name derives from its semelparous nature of flowering only once at the end of its long life. The plant dies after flowering, but produces adventitious shoots from the base, which continue its growth.

Taxonomy and naming
A. americana was one of the many species described by Carl Linnaeus in the 1753 edition of Species Plantarum, with the binomial name that is still used today.

Cultivation
A. americana is cultivated as an ornamental plant for the large dramatic form of mature plants—for modernist, drought-tolerant, and desert-style cactus gardens—among many planted settings. It is often used in hot climates and where drought conditions occur.  The plants can be evocative of 18th-19th-century Spanish colonial and Mexican provincial areas in the Southwestern United States, California, and xeric Mexico. It is also a popular landscape plant in dry beach gardens in Florida and coastal areas of the Southeastern United States.

When grown as a house plant, A. americana is tolerant of light levels ranging from direct sunlight to shade and requires little watering. It should be grown in a very porous, sandy potting soil, allowed to dry out between waterings, and repotted every spring.

Subspecies and varieties
Two subspecies and two varieties of A. americana are recognized by the World Checklist of Selected Plant Families:
A. americana subsp. americana
A. americana subsp. protamericana Gentry
A. americana var. expansa (Jacobi) Gentry
A. americana var. oaxacensis Gentry
A. americana var. marginata Trel. in L.H.Bailey, Stand. Cycl. Hort. 1: 235 (1914).
A. americana var. picta (Salm-Dyck) A.Terracc., Prim. Contr. Monogr. Agave (1885).
Cultivars include:
'Marginata'  with yellow stripes along the margins of each leaf
'Mediopicta'  with a broad cream central stripe
'Mediopicta Alba'  with a central white band
'Mediopicta Aurea' with a central yellow band
'Striata' with multiple yellow to white stripes along the leaves
'Variegata'  with white edges on the leaves.
(those marked , as well as the parent species, have gained the Royal Horticultural Society's Award of Garden Merit).

Uses

Cuisine
If the flower stem is cut before flowering, a sweet liquid called aguamiel ("honey water") gathers in the hollowed heart of the plant.  This can be fermented to produce the alcoholic drink called pulque or octli in pre-Columbian Mexico.

In the tequila-producing regions of Mexico, agaves are called mezcales. The high-alcohol product of fermented agave distillation is called mezcal; A. americana is one of several agaves used for distillation. A mezcal called tequila is produced from Agave tequilana, commonly called "blue agave". The many different types of mezcal include some which may be flavored with the very pungent mezcal worm. Mezcal and tequila, although also produced from agave plants, are different from pulque in their technique for extracting the sugars from the heart of the plant, and in that they are distilled spirits. In mezcal and tequila production, the sugars are extracted from the piñas (or hearts) by heating them in ovens, rather than by collecting aguamiel from the plant's cut stalk. Thus, if one were to distill pulque, it would not be a form of mezcal, but rather a different drink.

Agaves are also found throughout Latin America, and are used similarly. In Ecuador, the analog of pulque is guarango, and more recently this has been distilled as miske.

Agave nectar is marketed as a natural form of sugar with a low glycemic index that is due to its high fructose content.

Fibers 
The leaves yield fibers, known as pita, which are suitable for making rope, nets, bags, sacks, matting, or coarse cloth. They are also used for embroidery of leather in a technique known as piteado. Both pulque and maguey fiber were important to the economy of pre-Columbian Mexico.

Medicine
Agave americana contains agavose, a sugar with the same chemical formula of sucrose (C12H22O11), but with only 0.32 of its sweetening power, as well as agavasaponins and agavosides. It is used in traditional medicine to treat several ailments, and as a laxative, diuretic and diaphoretic, although a systematic review did not find enough data to support its effectiveness or safety. A. americana is known to be able to cause severe allergic dermatitis.

Heraldry
The plant figures in the coat of arms of Don Diego de Mendoza, a Native American governor of the village of Ajacuba, Hidalgo.

Art
The Aztecs pulped the leaves of A. americana to create paper—the Humboldt fragments were made in this way.

See also 
 Purpuric agave dermatitis

References

Further reading
Brandes, Stanley. "Maguey". Encyclopedia of Mexico. Chicago: Fitzroy Dearborn 1997, pp. 767–769.
Gonçalves de Lima, Oswaldo. El maguey y el pulque en los códices mexicanos. Mexico City: Fondo de Cultura Económica 1956.
Payno, Manuel. Memoria sobre el maguey mexicano y sus diversos productos. Mexico City: Boix 1864.

External links

Lady Bird Johnson Wildflower Center Native Plant Information Network (NPIN) — Agave americana
 Agave americana — UC Photos gallery

americana
Flora of Northeastern Mexico
Flora of Northwestern Mexico
Flora of Central Mexico
Flora of the Chihuahuan Desert
Flora of Arizona
Flora of Texas
Flora of Sonora
Flora of Coahuila
Flora of Tamaulipas
Flora of Nuevo León
Flora of San Luis Potosí
Flora of Oaxaca
Flora of Jalisco
Flora of Querétaro
Flora of Veracruz
Plants described in 1753
Taxa named by Carl Linnaeus
Crops originating from Mexico
Fiber plants
Plants used in traditional Native American medicine
Garden plants of North America
Drought-tolerant plants